German submarine U-580 was a Type VIIC U-boat of Nazi Germany's Kriegsmarine during World War II.

She carried out no patrols and sank no ships.

She was sunk after a collision in the Baltic Sea on 11 November 1941.

Design
German Type VIIC submarines were preceded by the shorter Type VIIB submarines. U-580 had a displacement of  when at the surface and  while submerged. She had two shafts and two  propellers.

U-580 was fitted with five  torpedo tubes (four fitted at the bow and one at the stern), fourteen torpedoes, one  SK C/35 naval gun, 220 rounds, and a  C/30 anti-aircraft gun. The boat had a complement of between forty-four and sixty.

Service history
The submarine was laid down on 31 August 1940 at Blohm & Voss, Hamburg as yard number 556, launched on 28 May 1941 and commissioned on 24 July under the command of Oberleutnant zur See Hans-Günther Kuhlmann.

She served with the 5th U-boat Flotilla from 24 July 1941.

Fate
U-580 was sunk after a collision with the target ship Angelburg in the Baltic Sea on 11 November 1941.

Twelve men died and there were 32 survivors.
Obermaat Walter Sagawe saved three sailors, but he sank with U-580. We have this Information in a Letter from Kommandant Kuhlmann.

U-580 was found in the Baltic sea near Lithuanian port city of Klaipėda on 1 July 2013  by a Lithuanian diving team.

References

Bibliography

External links

German Type VIIC submarines
U-boats commissioned in 1941
U-boats sunk in 1941
U-boat accidents
World War II submarines of Germany
1941 ships
Ships built in Hamburg
World War II shipwrecks in the Baltic Sea
Maritime incidents in November 1941